Mastacembelus ophidium is a species of fish in the family Mastacembelidae. It is endemic to Lake Tanganyika where it is a secretive fish, hiding in the sediment or between rocks on sandy shores.

References

ophidium
Fish of Lake Tanganyika
Taxonomy articles created by Polbot
Fish described in 1894
Taxa named by Albert Günther